Manuel Benedito Vives (25 December 1875 – 20 June 1963) was a Spanish painter. He was born in Valencia on Christmas 1875. His father was a taxidermist, and his brother was a musician. At age 13 he was enrolled in the San Carlos School of Fine Arts, from which he graduated six years later. Upon graduation, he began work in Joaquín Sorolla's workshop and traveled to Madrid with him two years later.

He was a member of the Academia de Bellas Artes de España from 1900 to 1904 and later worked as a teacher at the School of San Fernando.

He painted landscapes, still lifes, and portraits, the later of which he was best known for, especially towards the end of his career. He painted Alfonso XIII several times. In 1944, he received the Civil Order of Alfonso X, the Wise.

The Fundación Manuel Benedito museum, founded in October 2020 by Vicenta Benedito, his niece, is dedicated to his work. The museum is located in what used to be his studio in Madrid.

References 

1875 births
1963 deaths
19th-century Spanish painters
19th-century Spanish male artists
Spanish male painters
20th-century Spanish painters
20th-century Spanish male artists
People from Valencia
Spanish portrait painters
Painters from the Valencian Community